Block is a German, Dutch and English surname. Notable people with the surname include: 

 Adam Block (disambiguation), list of multiple people
 Adriaen Block (1567–1627), Dutch trader and navigator
 Agnes Block (1629–1704), Dutch botanist and art collector
 Amanda Roth Block (1912–2011), American artist
 Anna Katharina Block (1642–1719), German painter
 Austin Block (born 1989), American ice hockey player
 Axel Block (born 1947), German cinematographer
 Barbara Block, American marine biologist
 Benjamin Block (1631–1690), German painter
 Bill Block (born 1954), American film producer 
 Billy Block (1955–2015), American musical artist
 Bob Block (1921–2011), British scriptwriter
 Brandon Block (born 1967), British DJ
 Brett Ellen Block (born 1973), American novelist
 Bruce Block (born 1967), American entertainer
 Bruce A. Block, American film producer
 Bruno Block (1885–1937), American baseball player
 Carl Block (1874–1948), Swedish bishop
 Carson Block (born 1977), American businessman
 Cy Block (1919-2004), American baseball player
 Dan Block, American musician
 Daniel Block (1802–1853), American Jewish leader
 Daniel I. Block (born 1943), American scholar
 David Block (1908–2001), British army officer
 Dorothy Block (1904–1984), American artist
 Doug Block (born 1953), American filmmaker
 Eric Block (born 1942), American chemist
 Francesca Lia Block (born 1962), American writer
 Frank Block (American politician)
 Frank Block (Australian politician) (1899–1971), Australian politician
 Fred L. Block (born 1947), American sociologist
 Frederic Block (born 1934), American judge
 Gay Block (born 1942), American photographer
 Gene D. Block (born 1948), American biologist
 Gladys Block, American nutritionist
 Hal Block (1913–1981), American comedian
 Harlon Block (1924–1945), American Marine Corps corporal, one of six marines depicted in Raising the Flag on Iwo Jima
 Herbert Lawrence Block (1909–2001), American political cartoonist known as Herblock
 Hertha Block (1906–?), German librarian 
 Holly Block (1958–2017), American museum and art gallery director
 Hunt Block (born 1954), American actor
 Ira Block (born 1949), American photographer
 Jack Block (1924–2010), American psychologist
 Jacob Block (1580–1646), Dutch painter
 James Block (born 1968), British canoer
 Jamie Block, American musician
 Jason Block (born 1989), Canadian swimmer
 Jeanne Block (1923–1981), American psychologist
 Jerzy Block (1904–1996), Polish actor and director
 Joe Block (born 1978), American sports announcer
 Joel Block (born 1943), American psychologist
 Joel G. Block, American businessman 
 Johannes Block (1894–1945), German army general
 John Block (disambiguation), list of multiple people
 John Rusling Block (born 1935), American government official
 Josef Block (1863–1943), German painter
 Julius H. Block (1860–1915), American politician
 Karl M. Block (1886–1958), American bishop
 Kelly Block (born 1961), Canadian politician
 Ken Block (disambiguation), list of multiple people
 Kieran Block (born 1985), Canadian hockey player
 King Block (disambiguation), list of multiple people
 Larry Block (1942–2012), American actor
 Lauren Block, American marketing academic
 Lawrence Block (born 1938), American crime writer
 Lawrence J. Block (born 1951), American judge
 Libbie Block (1910–1972), American writer
 Lynda Lyon Block (1948–2002), American murderer
 Malú Block (1904–1989, born María Luisa Cabrera), Mexican artist
 Mark Block (born 1954), American political strategist
 Martin Block (1903–1967), American disc jockey
 Martin M. Block (1925–2016), American physicist
 Marty Block (born 1950), American politician
 Mathilde Block (1850–1932), German politician
 Maurice Block (1816–1901), German-French statistician and economist
 Melissa Block (born 1961), American radio host
 Melvin Block (1928–1985), American lawyer
 Michel Block (1937–2003), Belgian-French pianist
 Micky Block (1940–2019), English footballer
 Mike Block (born 1982), American musician
 Mitchell Block (born 1950), American filmmaker
 Ned Block (born 1942), American philosopher
 Nili Block (born 1995), Israeli kickboxer and Muay Thai fighter
 Noga Block (born 2004), Israeli rhythmic gymnast
 Paul Block (1877–1941), American newspaper publisher
 Peter Block (disambiguation), list of multiple people
 Priscilla Block (born 1995), American singer
 Ralph Block (1889–1974), American film producer
 Richard Earl Block (born 1931), American mathematician
 Ron Block (born 1964), American musician
 Rory Block (born 1949), American musician
 Rudolph Edgar Block (1870–1940), Jewish American journalist
 Ryan Block (born 1982), American technology entrepreneur
 Samuel Block (disambiguation), list of multiple people
 Sandy Block (1917–1985), American musician 
 Shannon Block (born 1979), American chief executive
 Sharon Block (born 1941), American politician
 Sherman Block (1924–1998), American sheriff
 Sherry Block (born 1971), American archer
 Simon Block, British screenwriter and producer
 Spencer Block (1908–1979), English cricketer
 Stanley Block, American academic
 Stefan Merrill Block (born 1982), American writer
 Stephanie J. Block (born 1972), American actress and singer
 Steven Block (born 1952), American biophysicist and Professor 
 Stu Block (born 1977), Canadian singer and songwriter
 Stuart Block (born 1979), English cricketer
 Susan Block, American sexologist
 Vanessa Block, American film director, screenwriter and producer
 Walter Block (born 1941), American economist and author
Fictional characters
 Mr. Block, American comics character created in 1912

See also 

 Blok (surname)
 Black (surname)

Surnames
English-language surnames
German-language surnames
Dutch-language surnames
Germanic-language surnames
Surnames of German origin